Mahatma Gandhi "International" School (MGIS)  in Mithakali, Ahmedabad, India, is the first authorized IB World School in Gujarat, having obtained that status in November 2002. MGIS is also registered with the University of Cambridge International Examinations, the Mission Laïque Française  and Edexcel. The school enrolls approximately 200 students from  the local community as well as expatriate children.

History
The school is a Public Partnership. It was established in 1998 by Dr Pascal Chazot and Anju Musafir in collaboration with the Ahmedabad Municipal Corporation. The building in which the school is located was donated by Sheth Motilal Hirabhai, the family of Dr. Bihari Kanhaiyalal. The school is authorised to offer the International Baccalaureate Middle Years Programme since November 2002 and the International Baccalaureate Diploma Programme since March 2005.

Academics and extra-curricular activities
The school follows the Cambridge International Primary Programme for classes 1-5, the IB MYP Programme for classes 6-10 and the IB Diploma Programme for classes 11-12. The school offers Hindi and French as a second language to its students in the Diploma programme. The school has links with other international schools in the world such as L'Ecole Aujourd'hui and Lycée Saint Germain en Laye from Paris and Mercedes College from Adelaide.

MGIS was the first school in Ahmedabad to have males and females in the football team which was able to defeat several other teams.

See also

International Baccalaureate

References

External links

Cambridge schools in India
International Baccalaureate schools in India
Schools in Ahmedabad
Educational institutions established in 1998
1998 establishments in India